Aestuariimonas is a Gram-negative, aerobic genus of bacteria from the family of Flavobacteriaceae with one known species (Aestuariimonas insulae). Aestuariimonas insulae has been isolated from tidal flat  from Oido.

References

Flavobacteria
Bacteria genera
Monotypic bacteria genera
Taxa described in 2018